Hoglund Ballpark is a baseball stadium in Lawrence, Kansas.  It is the home field for the University of Kansas' baseball team.  The stadium holds 3,000 people and opened for baseball in 1958.  The stadium sits next to historic Allen Fieldhouse, home to the Kansas Jayhawks basketball teams. It is named after former Jayhawk baseball shortstop and former petroleum-industry CEO Forrest Hoglund.

Following the 2010 season, an artificial turf surface was installed at the facility.  The installation, which was overseen by AstroTurf USA at a cost of $1.2 million, all of which was funded by donations to the Jayhawk baseball program.

See also
 List of NCAA Division I baseball venues

References

External links
 

College baseball venues in the United States
Sports venues in Kansas
Kansas Jayhawks baseball
University of Kansas campus
Baseball venues in Kansas
1958 establishments in Kansas
Sports venues completed in 1958